Beson is a surname, similar to Bason and Benson. Notable people with the surname include:

 Timothy Beson, American politician
 Warren Beson (1923–1959), American football player and coach

See also 
 Bison